Lapstone is a township on the eastern escarpment of the Blue Mountains in New South Wales, Australia. Elevation 160 m (525 ft). Lapstone is located 62 kilometres west of the Sydney CBD in the local government area of the City of Blue Mountains and is part of the federal electorate of Macquarie. Lapstone consists mostly of stand-alone housing and has a few public facilities. Lapstone was originally bought and developed by Mr Arthur J Hand, an Alderman of the Blue Mountains City Council.

Lapstone is the first town in the easternmost escarpment of the Blue Mountains. Its name comes from the many water worn stones in the area that resemble those used by cobblers to work the leather when making shoes.

History
Blaxland Lawson and Wentworth, were the first Europeans to explore the Lapstone area, climbing up the Lapstone Hill and reaching Glenbrook Lagoon on 12 May 1813, on their successful trek across the Great Dividing Range.

The first road was built by William Cox and a gang of convicts, up the Lapstone Hill through Lapstone and across the Blue Mountains, about 1815. (A plaque on the site of the old Cox Road can be seen off Governor Drive at the M4 junction). The Cox road was replaced by "The Western Road" across Lennox Stone Bridge and up the Lapstone Hill in 1833 and, following the railway in 1867, "The Great Western Highway". The Highway is now the main road up Lapstone Hill and across the Blue Mountains.

The Lapstone Zig Zag 

The Lapstone Zig Zag line (or "little" zig zag) opened near Glenbrook in 1867. The ascent of Lapstone Hill on a gradient of 1 in 30-33, was built up the side of the range with comparatively light earthwork, includes the substantial seven-span sandstone Knapsack Viaduct. The viaduct was later widened to carry the old Great Western Highway, when the deviation around the Lapstone Zig Zag was built. The zig zag is now part of a walking trail on the old railway/highway alignment, including a memorial to John Whitton, the engineer in charge of the construction of the Blue Mountains line and many other early railways. One feature of this line was the Lucasville platform built by John Lucas to access his property at Lapstone. Remains of it can still be seen.

The Glenbrook Tunnel 

A new route was opened on 18 December 1892 to avoid the Lapstone Zig Zag. After crossing the viaduct, the new line curved around to the west and went through a new tunnel, the Glenbrook Tunnel. The tunnel emerged further west near the Great Western Highway with a total of 660 metres in length. The tunnel can still be seen from neighbouring bush tracks. The new tunnel was hailed as a major improvement, but problems with ventilation and water from the nearby creek lead to trains getting stuck. The Glenbrook Tunnel was finally closed and replaced 24 September 1913.

The abandoned Glenbrook Tunnel was used by the nearby RAAF base during World War II as storage for arms such as bombs and mustard gas. The RAAF laid a concrete floor for better storage and access. It has also been used to grow mushrooms.

The New Glenbrook Tunnel 

In 1913, the present route was constructed to bypass the Glenbrook tunnel, going along the escarpment of Glenbrook Gorge and through a new tunnel at the spot known as The Bluff. One of the features of this project was the construction of a temporary railway line that crossed Darks Common south of Explorers Road. The rail line has been removed but the cutting can still be seen, as well as the remains of the winding house base near the escarpment. This was known as the Spur-line and was in operation from 1911 until 1913, the line and cutting now forming a part of a nature walk through Darks Common. The new Glenbrook Tunnel, 282 metres in length, came into operation on 11 May 1913, and is still used today.

The Lapstone Hill Hotel 

The land occupied by the present RAAF base was originally owned in the 1870s by John Lucas (1818 - 1902), He built a country retreat on the land called Lucasville, close to his private Lucasville railway station, but sold the property to Charles Smith. Smith built his own house, called Logie, higher up the hill, above the railway and Lucas’s little cottage. Charles Smith died in 1897. Logie house and estate was inherited by his son Colin. In 1921 Logie and its estate were bought by Herwold Kirkpatrick and his brother-in-law. Kirkpatrick was a well known architect and from the late 1920s he set out to transform the Logie Cottage and grounds into a luxury Hotel.

The Lapstone Hill Hotel was officially opened in 1930 and was a major Art Deco luxury hotel. The grounds of some 6 hectares (15 acres) were ‘tastefully planned with lawns, flowers, fruit and vegetable gardens, with water pumped from the Nepean River far below. The Hotel had great views of the Nepean River and offered views of the Sydney metropolis. The hotel was extremely fashionable all throughout the 1930s. The Hotel was noted for adverting the benefits of the mountain environment on ones health, and attracted many people from Sydney that wanted to escape the city life.

In 1949 the Lapstone Hill Hotel and grounds were offered to the Commonwealth Department of Defence as a new headquarters for the RAAF’s Eastern Area Command, the RAAF Base Glenbrook. No personnel actually lived in the 57 rooms of the former hotel during the first twenty years of RAAF use, but in 1982 a new administration block was opened and the former hotel became entirely the Officers’ Mess: about 35 officers were then accommodated in the upper storey. Downstairs suites are used for visiting VIPs and were created in 1994 by the architect Robert Staas and the interior designer Elizabeth Mackie, retaining the Art Deco theme

The New Lapstone Hotel 

The New Lapstone Hotel was built in the 1950s further up the Great Western Highway at Blaxland, after The Lapstone Hill Hotel and grounds was purchased by the RAAF. The Hotel was called "The New Lapstone Hotel" up until the 1980s.

Today the hotel is known as The Lapstone Hotel, It was renovated in 2007 after being purchased by the Lewis Group of Hotels.

Housing Development 
The Suburb of Lapstone was developed in the 1960s, Mr Arthur J Hand, an alderman of the Blue Mountains Council bought the land to develop the suburb. The Railway Station was opened in 1964 to service the new housing estate.

Darks Common 
Darks Common became a public reserve in the 1970s to prevent further housing development. The leading voice in the conservation of the area was local Micheal Dark, son of author Eleanor Dark and her husband Dr Erick Dark. The reserve now protected by council bears the name of the family.

There are many walking tracks throughout the common, the Spur-Line walking track leads to the Glenbrook Creek and views of Glenbrook Gorge at Bluff lookout. Lapstone Oval is located inside Darks Common.

Population 
In the 2016 Census, there were 961 people in Lapstone. 81.0% of people were born in Australia and 87.7% of people spoke only English at home. The most common responses for religion were No Religion 30.0%, Catholic 24.9% and Anglican 18.9%.

Gallery

Public Transport
Lapstone railway station is on the Blue Mountains Line of the NSW TrainLink interurban network. Lapstone can be accessed by road from the Great Western Highway/M4 Motorway by exiting at Governors Drive and Explorers Road from Glenbrook.

Lapstone Railway Station, was officially opened on 24 February 1964.

The area is also serviced by buses.

Education
 Lapstone Public School, opened in 1971.
 Lapstone Pre-school

Sport and Recreation
Lapstone Netball Courts are home to Lapstone Glenbrook Netball Club. There are 9 asphalt courts, and 2 grass courts at the complex, including a clubhouse and BBQ area. All clubs form the Blue Mountains Netball Association play matches at the complex on Saturdays. Netball is the largest participation sport in the Blue Mountains.

Founded in 1975, Lapstone Glenbrook Netball Club was formed from a merger between what was St Peter's Netball Club and school-based teams at Lapstone Public School and Glenbrook Public School. St Peter's Netball Club was a founding club of the Blue Mountains Netball Association and was run from the church organisation previously based in the St Peter's Anglican Church building which is now used as a cafe in Glenbrook).

Lapstone Oval is home to the Blue Mountains District Rugby Football Club, and its junior club Blue Tongues Rugby, featuring a Rugby Union field, an artificial cricket pitch. 

Glenbrook/Blaxland Cricket Club play matches on the oval in the summer months.

There are 2 Tennis Courts at Lapstone Oval, and children's play equipment.

References

External links
 Lapstone-New South Wales-Australia-Travel-theage.com.au
 Lapstone Rail Trail
 Lapstone Subreddit

Towns in New South Wales
Suburbs of the City of Blue Mountains